Kesha Rose Sebert (born March 1, 1987), formerly stylized as Ke$ha, is an American singer and songwriter. In 2005, at age 18, Kesha was signed to Kemosabe Records. Her first major success came in early 2009 after she was featured on American rapper Flo Rida's number-one single "Right Round".

Kesha's music and image propelled her to immediate success. She has earned two number-one albums on the US Billboard 200 with Animal (2010) and Rainbow (2017), and the top-ten records Warrior (2012) and High Road (2020). Kesha has attained ten top-ten singles on the US Billboard Hot 100, including "Tik Tok", "Blah Blah Blah", "Your Love Is My Drug", "Take It Off", "Blow", "Die Young", "My First Kiss" with 3OH!3, "We R Who We R", "Right Round" with Flo Rida, and "Timber" with Pitbull. Her 2009 single "Tik Tok" was the best-selling digital single in history, selling over 14 million units internationally, until surpassed in 2011.

Kesha's career was halted between Warrior and Rainbow due to a legal dispute with her former producer Dr. Luke, which has been ongoing since 2014. A series of lawsuits, known collectively as Kesha v. Dr. Luke, were exchanged between the two parties in which Kesha accused him of physical, sexual, and emotional abuse and employment discrimination against her, while Dr. Luke claims breach of contract and defamation by Kesha.

As of 2013, Kesha has reportedly sold over 33 million combined tracks and ringtones in the U.S alone and over 55 million worldwide to date. She was also listed as the 26th top artist on Billboards 2010s decade-end charts. She has received various awards and nominations, including her win for the MTV Europe Music Award for Best New Act in 2010. Kesha has also co-written songs for other artists, including "Till the World Ends" (2011) for Britney Spears and songs for Ariana Grande, Miley Cyrus, and Miranda Cosgrove.

Early life
Kesha Rose Sebert was born in Los Angeles on March 1, 1987. Her mother, Rosemary Patricia "Pebe" Sebert, is a singer-songwriter who co-wrote the 1978 single "Old Flames Can't Hold a Candle to You" with Hugh Moffatt for Joe Sun, made popular by country music artist Dolly Parton on her 1980 album Dolly, Dolly, Dolly. Pebe, a single mother, struggled financially while supporting herself, Kesha, and Kesha's older brother Lagan; they relied on welfare payments and food stamps to get by. When Kesha was an infant, Pebe would often have to look after her onstage while performing. Kesha says she has no knowledge of her father's identity. In 2011, a man named Bob Chamberlain who called himself her father approached Star with pictures and letters, claiming they proved that he and Kesha had been in regular contact as father and daughter before she turned 19. Her mother is mostly of Hungarian descent. One of Kesha's great-grandfathers was Polish.

Pebe moved the family to Nashville in 1991 after securing a new publishing deal for her songwriting. She frequently brought Kesha and her brothers along to recording studios and encouraged Kesha to sing after noticing Kesha's talent. Kesha attended Franklin High School and Brentwood High School, and said she did not fit in, explaining that her unconventional style (such as homemade purple velvet pants and purple hair) did not endear her to other students. She played the trumpet and later the saxophone in the marching band in school, and has said she was a diligent student. After attaining a near-perfect score on her SAT, she attended Barnard College, an affiliate college of Columbia University, but dropped out after three months to pursue her music career.

In addition to taking songwriting classes, Kesha was also taught how to write songs by Pebe, and they often wrote together when she returned home from high school. Kesha began recording demos, which Pebe gave to people she knew in the music business. Kesha was also in a band with Lagan. Kesha and Pebe co-wrote the song "Stephen" when Kesha was 16. Kesha then tracked down David Gamson, a producer she admired from Scritti Politti, who agreed to produce the song. She dropped out of school at 17, after Max Martin convinced her to return to Los Angeles to pursue a music career, and earned her GED after. Around this time, Pebe answered an advertisement from the American reality TV series The Simple Life looking for an "eccentric" family to host Paris Hilton and Nicole Richie. The episode featuring the Sebert family aired in 2005. Martin had received one of Kesha's demos from Samantha Cox, senior director of writer/publisher relations at Broadcast Music Incorporated, and was impressed. Billboard described two of the demos in a cover story, the first as "a gorgeously sung, self-penned country ballad" and the second as "a gobsmackingly awful trip-hop track" where Kesha raps ad lib for a minute after running out of lyrics. It was the latter track that attracted attention.

Career

2005–2009: Career beginnings 

In 2005, at age 18, Kesha was signed to the label Kemosabe Records, and the music publishing company Prescription Songs. Kemosabe Records is owned by Sony Music Entertainment and located in Los Angeles. Sony Music Entertainment partnered to create Kemosabe Records. Other artists that have signed with Kemosabe Records include Juicy J, Rock City, Zara Larsson, Lil Bibby, and Becky G. Kesha later sang background vocals for Paris Hilton's single, "Nothing in This World". Kesha then signed with David Sonenberg's management company, DAS Communications Inc., in 2006. DAS was tasked with obtaining a major label record deal for Kesha in a year's time in exchange for 20 percent of her music income, with her having the option of ending the relationship if they failed. She worked with several writers and producers while at the company and ended up co-writing Australian pop group The Veronicas' single "This Love" with producer Toby Gad. While furthering her career in the studio, Kesha earned her living as a waitress. While struggling to get by, she began stylizing her name as 'Ke$ha', explaining the dollar sign as an ironic gesture.

In 2008, Kesha appeared in the video for her friend Katy Perry's single "I Kissed a Girl", and sang background vocals for Britney Spears' "Lace and Leather". DAS soon attracted the attention of songwriter and A&R Kara DioGuardi, who wanted to sign Kesha to Warner Bros. Records. The deal fell through due to her existing contract with Kemosabe. In September that year, she allegedly terminated her contract with DAS.  Kesha would appear on rapper Flo Rida's number-one single "Right Round" in early 2009, which exposed her to some mainstream attention. According to the parties present, the collaboration happened by accident; she had simply walked into a recording session for the song and Flo Rida happened to have wanted a female voice on it. It was reported that Flo Rida liked the result so much that he recorded one more track with Kesha for his album. However, she is not credited for her feature on the United States release of "Right Round" and did not collect any money for the part. She also refused to appear in the video, explaining to men's magazine Esquire that she wanted to make a name for herself on her own terms.

2009–2011: Breakthrough, Animal, and Cannibal 

After failing to negotiate with Lava Records and Atlantic Records in 2009, Kesha signed a multi-album deal with RCA Records. Having spent the previous 6 years working on material for her debut album, she began putting finishing touches to the album. For the album, she wrote approximately 200 songs. It was certified Platinum in the United States and had sold two million albums worldwide by September of that year. The album's lead single, "Tik Tok", broke the record in the United States for the highest sales week for a single, with 610,000 digital downloads sold in a single week, the highest ever by a female artist since digital download tracking began in 2003. It spent nine weeks at number one in the country and became the longest running number-one by a female artist on her debut single since Debby Boone and "You Light Up My Life" in 1977. As of 2019, "Tik Tok" has sold about 14 million copies worldwide, becoming the best-selling single in digital history and the best-selling digital single in history by a female solo artist. Subsequent singles from the album ("Blah Blah Blah", "Your Love Is My Drug" and "Take It Off") achieved similar commercial success, each reaching the top ten in Australia, Canada, and the United States. Kesha was also featured on two top ten singles by musician Taio Cruz and electropop duo 3OH!3.

Kesha's deliberately unpolished aesthetic and juvenile stage persona, which she described as her own personality "times ten", quickly made her a deeply polarizing figure. Some of her critics found her output to be unsophisticated, while others felt that she was manufactured and lacked credibility. In May 2010, Kesha's former managers from DAS Communications Inc. filed a lawsuit against her, seeking $14 million from her for commissions on her RCA Records deal, alleging that she had extended the deadline for them to get her a major record label contract and squeezed them out of her career. Kesha launched her own lawsuit in October, citing the California-exclusive Talent Agencies Act and asking the California Labor Commissioner to declare her contract with DAS void because it had acted as an unlicensed talent agent while procuring work for her in California, where only licensed agents can do so. The case was settled in 2012 before the release of her second album. Kesha held a benefit concert on June 16, 2010, where all proceeds went to aid victims of the 2010 Tennessee floods in her hometown Nashville. She raised close to $70,000 from the event. She was a supporting act on the summer North American leg of Rihanna's Last Girl on Earth and was awarded Best New Act at the 2010 MTV Europe Music Awards.

In November 2010, Animal was re-released with a companion extended play, Cannibal. The lead single taken from Cannibal, "We R Who We R", debuted at the top of the Billboard Hot 100 chart in the United States. With two number ones and four top ten hits (among them her featured spot on 3OH!3's "My First Kiss") Kesha was named Hot 100 Artist of 2010 by Billboard magazine, with "Tik Tok" ranked as the best-performing song of the year in the US. The follow-up single from Cannibal, "Blow", also charted in the top ten on the Hot 100. By June 2011, Kesha had sold almost 21 million digital single downloads in the United States alone. In February 2011, Kesha embarked on her first headlining world tour, the Get Sleazy Tour. The tour was expanded with a summer leg due to the first leg selling out and spanned three continents. Kesha also co-wrote the song "Till the World Ends" for American popstar Britney Spears and was featured on the remix of the song along with rapper Nicki Minaj. After meeting Kesha at the 2010 Grammy Awards and guesting at a number of her concerts, rock singer Alice Cooper asked her to write lyrics for and vocally perform as a devil character on their duet track, "What Baby Wants", on Cooper's album Welcome 2 My Nightmare (2011).

Kesha was named rights group Humane Society of the United States's first global ambassador for animal rights, for which she is expected to bring attention to such practices as cosmetics testing on animals and shark finning. Kesha received the Wyler Award presented by The Humane Society as a celebrity or public figure who increases awareness of animal issues via the media. She received the award March 23, 2013, at The 2013 Genesis Awards Benefit Gala. She also appeared alongside rock singer Iggy Pop in a campaign for PETA, protesting the clubbing of baby seals in Canada and later wrote on behalf of the organization to McDonald's over the conditions of their slaughterhouses.

2012–2013: Warrior and other projects 

Kesha's second studio album, Warrior, was released on November 30, 2012. She began writing for the album while on her own headlining tour in 2011. The album featured productions from Max Martin, as well as a song by Wayne Coyne, the lead singer of the alternative band The Flaming Lips. Coyne had reached out to Kesha for a collaboration after hearing that she was a fan of the band. Besides working on Kesha's album, they recorded the song "2012 (You Must Be Upgraded)" for the band's album, The Flaming Lips and Heady Fwends (2012). To coincide with the release of the album, Kesha released the illustrated autobiography My Crazy Beautiful Life through Touchstone Books in November 2012. The first single taken from Warrior was "Die Young". The song debuted at number thirteen on the Billboard Hot 100 and eventually peaked at number 2. The song also charted across Europe and the English-speaking world and reached the top ten in Australia, Canada, and Belgium.

"C'Mon", the album's second single, underperformed commercially, only peaking at number 27 on the Billboard Hot 100 and ending her string of top ten hits on the chart. Despite this, "C'Mon" continued Kesha's streak of top ten hits (with nine) on the Mainstream Top 40 Pop Songs chart, also graphed by Billboard. In July 2013, Kesha started the Warrior Tour, which would support the album. The North American leg was co-headlined with American rapper Pitbull. Kesha's third single from Warrior, "Crazy Kids", was released in April 2013 and also under-performed, peaking at number 40 on the Hot 100, number 19 on the Mainstream Top 40, yet did achieve massive success in South Korea and Belgium, peaking at numbers 2 and 5 in those countries, respectively. A TV documentary, Kesha: My Crazy Beautiful Life, began airing on MTV also in April 2013.

In July 2013, The Flaming Lips stated their intention of releasing a full-length collaborative album with Kesha, called Lipsha. However, the project eventually cancelled in the winter of the same year. Kesha sent a message to a fan expressing how it was out of her control and that she wanted to release the material, even for free, saying that she did not care about the money. On October 7, 2013, Kesha and Pitbull released a collaboration, "Timber", which became an international commercial success and Kesha's third number-one and tenth top-ten single on the Billboard Hot 100.

2014–2016: Lawsuit and personal struggles 
In January 2014, Kesha checked into a rehabilitation center for bulimia nervosa and began to work on her third studio album. After rehab, she switched to using her birth name, Kesha, rather than her previous moniker, Ke$ha. In her August 2014 Teen Vogue cover interview, Kesha revealed she recorded 14 new songs while in rehab. In June 2014, Kesha claimed a seat as an expert in the American television singing competition Rising Star, alongside Brad Paisley and Ludacris. In October 2014, Kesha sued producer Dr. Luke for sexual assault and battery, sexual harassment, gender violence, emotional abuse, and violation of California business practices which had occurred over 10 years working together. The lawsuit went on for nearly a year before Kesha sought a preliminary injunction to release her from Kemosabe Records. On February 19, 2016, New York Supreme Court Justice Shirley Kornreich ruled against this request. On April 6, 2016, Kornreich dismissed the case, saying that even if the allegations of sexual assault were accepted as true, the five-year statute of limitations had run out on the two most specific rape allegations, one occurring in 2005 and the other in 2008.

On August 4, 2015, Kesha signed with American performance rights organization SESAC Inc. Kesha guest starred in the second season of the U.S. television series Jane the Virgin, which aired on October 12, 2015. The singer played Annabelle, the show's protagonist's hostile neighbor. In December 2015, Kesha revealed that she had formed a country music and classic rock-influenced band called Yeast Infection and performed a live show with the band in Nashville on December 23.

2016–2018: Rainbow and touring 

Kesha appeared during Zedd's slot at the 2016 Coachella music festival to perform "True Colors", a track from Zedd's second studio album. The cameo marked her first high-profile public performance since her ongoing legal battle with Dr. Luke. A studio version of the collaboration was released as a single on April 29, 2016. On May 22, 2016, Kesha covered Bob Dylan's song "It Ain't Me Babe" at the 2016 Billboard Music Awards. On June 11, 2016, Kesha performed at Pride in the Street in Pittsburgh, Pennsylvania. Afterwards, Kesha embarked on her third worldwide concert tour, the Kesha and the Creepies: Fuck the World Tour (2016–2017). The tour commenced on July 23, 2016, in Las Vegas and ended on July 21, 2017, in Aurora, Illinois, after various shows in China as well. The tour included various covers of songs and several rock and country reworks of Kesha's own hit singles. During this time, it was revealed that Kesha had recorded 22 songs on her own and had given them to her label, and was in the process of recording a third studio album.

On July 6, 2017, Kesha released a single, titled "Praying". The single charted successfully at number 6 on the music charts of Australia, selling over 140,000 copies and being certified 2× Platinum in the country. The single charted at number 22 and number 11 in the United States and Canada respectively, and subsequently was certified Platinum in both territories. "Praying" was released as the lead single from Kesha's third studio album, Rainbow, which was released on August 11, 2017. Rainbow debuted at number one on the Billboard 200 chart in the United States, becoming her second number-one album in the country, and was the subject of universal acclaim from music critics, with several complimenting the album's feminist angle and uniqueness as well as Kesha's vocal performance and ability to interweave different music genres. Three tracks from Rainbow were released as promotional singles ahead of the album's release; "Woman", "Learn to Let Go" and "Hymn", two of which were released with accompanying music videos. "Learn to Let Go" was later released as the second single from the album in November 2017. The album received nominations for Best Pop Vocal Album and Best Pop Solo Performance (for "Praying") at the 60th Annual Grammy Awards, marking Kesha's first Grammy nominations.

To promote Rainbow, Kesha embarked on the Rainbow Tour (2017–2019), which began on September 26, 2017, in Birmingham, Alabama, and visited North America, Europe, Oceania, and Asia. She furthered promotion by joining a co-headlining concert tour with American rapper Macklemore named The Adventures of Kesha and Macklemore (2018). This tour took place in North America between June 6, 2018, and August 5, 2018. Kesha's documentary film, Rainbow: The Film, was released on Apple Music on August 10, 2018. The documentary chronicles her stint in rehab for her eating disorder and the creation of Rainbow. In the same month, Kesha collaborated with British rock band The Struts on the remix of their song "Body Talks", released as a single from their album Young & Dangerous (2018). On September 19, 2018, Kesha released her song "Here Comes the Change", which served as a single to promote On the Basis of Sex (2018), a biographical film about Ruth Bader Ginsburg. In October 2018, Kesha collaborated, wrote, and performed on the song "Safe" with her younger brother Sage Sebert and rapper Chika, as an homage for the Parkland, Florida school shooting.

2019–2022: High Road
In February 2019, Kesha hosted a 4-day-long cruise called Kesha's Weird and Wonderful Rainbow Ride. Sailing on the Norwegian Pearl, the cruise set off in Tampa, Florida and ended in Nassau, Bahamas. Special guests included Wrabel, Jonathan Van Ness, Betty Who, Detox, and Superfruit, among others. On June 2, Kesha released a digital single titled "Rich, White, Straight Men". On July 25, Kesha released the promo single "Best Day" for the film The Angry Birds Movie 2. On November 7, Kesha officially announced her own cosmetics line in partnership with indie makeup brand Hipdot, Kesha Rose Beauty, which was released December 6. The line features an eyeshadow palette with each color named after her songs, two double-ended waterproof eyeliners, a red lipstick, and a lipgloss.

High Road, Kesha's fourth studio album, was released January 31, 2020. The album performed moderately commercially and received positive reviews. Originally slated for December 2019, Kesha released a trailer on October 21, 2019, to confirm the album's title as High Road. Prior to its release, the album saw the release of four singles: "Raising Hell" featuring Big Freedia, "My Own Dance", "Resentment" featuring Brian Wilson, Sturgill Simpson and Wrabel, and "Tonight".

In February 2020, Kesha's 2010 promotional single "Cannibal" gained viral status following a dance trend using it on the video sharing platform TikTok. Following this, the song became a top 40 single in Canada and a new lyric video for the song was released. While self-isolating in her home due to the coronavirus pandemic, Kesha created a song titled "Home Alone". On April 18, 2020, she performed at the One World: Together at Home benefit event.

Kesha announced the creation of her own podcast, Kesha and the Creepies, with an announcement video on November 13, 2020. The podcast explores supernatural subjects and alternative lifestyles with pop culture guests and  supernatural experts such as Alice Cooper, Demi Lovato, Tyler Henry, Ben Folds and more. The first episode was released on November 19, 2020, with new episodes premiering almost every Friday. The first season ran for 30 episodes, with the final episode airing on June 10, 2021.

She later released several collaborations throughout 2020 and 2021, including "Chasing Rainbows" with Big Freedia, "Since I Was Young" with Wrabel, "Stronger" with Dutch DJ, Sam Feldt, and remixes of Walker Hayes' single, "Fancy Like", and Grandson's "Drop Dead".

Following the cancellation of the High Road Tour due to the COVID-19 pandemic, Kesha embarked on her fifth headlining tour, Kesha Live (2021) with Betty Who serving as the opening act. The tour began on August 13, 2021, in Billings, Montana, and was originally to have 11 shows in the U.S., but got extended to 22, ending on September 12, 2021. Seven more tour dates were announced for late March 2022, which will be followed by Kesha's second cruise tour, scheduled to set sail on April 1, 2022. However, the cruise and the spring tour dates were cancelled due to undisclosed reasons.

Kesha provided vocals for the song, "Taste So Good", which also featured Hayley Kiyoko, Vincint, and MNEK. The song was released on June 1, 2022, and was used to promote the cannabis infused drink, Cann.

She starred and executive produced the show, Conjuring Kesha, which premiered on July 8, 2022, on Discovery+. In the show, Kesha and her celebrity friends explore paranormal hotspots.

2023–present: Upcoming fifth studio album 
On an Instagram Livestream in February 2023, Kesha previewed a 30 second snippet of a new song. On her 36th birthday, the singer wiped her Instagram feed, and updated her profile picture to her new logo. In a second livestream, she revealed four new song titles: "Living in My Head", "Fine Line", "The Drama", and "Eat the Acid", the latter two she shared snippets of.

Artistry

Musical style and image 

Kesha wrote or co-wrote every song on her first two albums and considers herself a songwriter primarily, writing for artists including Britney Spears and Miley Cyrus. Along with a mezzo-soprano voice, she possesses a "strong, sneering vibrato", with a distinct yodel-like quality to her voice; she employs actual yodeling on the songs "Tik Tok" and "Cannibal". Having previously done country, pop rock, and electro, she had a clear idea of the synth-pop sound that she wanted for her debut album. The genre was popular at the time with many of her peers releasing similar sounds. Both of those albums are of the genre with catchy hooks and synthesized productions often compared to pop singer Dev by music critics, creating misunderstandings among the fans of the two. "Party at a Rich Dude's House" and "C U Next Tuesday" have 1980s derived backing, while "Stephen" begins with "Kansas-style vocal harmonies". "Dinosaur" follows a verse-chorus formula, and has a "cheerleader-type tune" reminiscent of "Hollaback Girl" (2005) by Gwen Stefani and "Girlfriend" (2007) by Avril Lavigne; the song uses the overt symbolism of dinosaurs, carnivory, and other primitive motifs to tell the story of an older man who preys on younger women. According to Kesha, the song is based on true events. While her vocals on Animal were heavily processed with auto-tune, often to produce rapid stuttering or over-pitch corrected vocal effects, leading to questions on vocal talent, she expressed confidence in her abilities, showing some of her vocal talent in the ballads "Animal" and "Hungover" on the album.

Kesha's second studio album Warrior used considerably less autotune, although it still showed in a number of songs. The album's piano and guitar-driven ballads such as "Love into the Light", "Wonderland" and "Past Lives" display Kesha's vocal ability. Kesha also uses a trademark talky "white-girl" rapping style with exaggerated discordant phrasing and enunciation. Her vocal technique has led her to be credited as a rapper, a topic she disagreed with until fellow rappers André 3000, Wiz Khalifa, and Snoop Dogg endorsed her. On the subject, she said: "The first time someone called me a rapper, I started laughing. I was shocked, and thought it was hilarious. It's crazy and funny to me." The New York Times said Kesha "threatens to become the most influential female rapper of the day, or at least the most popular. Pretending Kesha isn't a rapper is no longer feasible." "Crazy Kids" and "C'Mon" took greater shifts into "party rap". Most of her lyrics chronicle her relationships and partying; the lighthearted subject matter of the latter and her unfiltered language saw many critics criticizing her for releasing frivolous and crass music. Jonah Weiner of Slate, however, stated that her jarring lyrics allowed her songs to become more memorable. In "Blah Blah Blah" and "Boots & Boys", she objectifies men to poke fun at how male fronted rock bands and rappers can get away with objectifying women and not vice versa. The title track to her debut, "Animal", is more aspirational and is intended to inspire people to embrace their individuality. Much more experimental than Animal, her second album, Warrior, contains dubstep elements and explores erotic experiences Kesha encountered with ghosts on the song "Supernatural". Overall, Kesha said the theme of Warrior is magic.

Critics praised Warrior for its rock music influences, despite the album being deeply rooted in technopop. Applauding the album's rock sound, Rolling Stone called the album Kesha's rock manifesto. Rock icons The Flaming Lips, Iggy Pop, and Alice Cooper have collaborated with Kesha, endorsing her as a rock singer. Cooper told Billboard, "I immediately looked at her and went, 'This girl is not a pop diva. She's a rock singer.' She would much rather be the female Robert Plant than the next Britney Spears." The A.V. Club said that Warrior proved Kesha a capable vocalist and songwriter. The Washington Post said that the album is "pure fun", opining that Kesha can write good hooks despite her sometimes vapid lyricism.

Influences 

Kesha has been influenced by various genres and artists; Madonna, Queen, the Rolling Stones, the Killers, Neutral Milk Hotel, the Black Eyed Peas, Gwen Stefani, Casiotone for the Painfully Alone, Janet Jackson, Michael Jackson, Gary Glitter and Beck have all influenced her music. Her vocal style draws heavily from the song "Tthhee Ppaarrttyy" from the 2007 Justice album Cross. After experimenting with country, pop rock, and electronic music, Kesha stuck with the latter. Thematically, her music generally revolves around escapism, partying, individuality, supernatural moments, rebellion, and grief. Kesha's musical influences also consist of hip hop, punk rock, crunkcore, glam rock, pop, dance music and classic country. Her country influences of Dolly Parton and Johnny Cash come from her mother's country songwriting, while her older brother exposed her to hip-hop and punk bands, Fugazi, Dinosaur Jr. and the Beastie Boys.  She credits her straightforward story-based lyrics to her love for the honest storytelling style of country music, while the title track from her debut album was created with music of alternative rock bands The Flaming Lips and Arcade Fire in mind. She singled out the Beastie Boys as a major influence, telling Newsweek that she had always wanted to be like them and aspired to make "youthful, irreverent anthems" as well. She called her debut album, Animal, a homage to the Beastie Boys' Licensed to Ill and credited the creation of the rap driven "Tik Tok" to her love for the Beastie Boys' rap music. For her first headlining tour, Kesha wanted to emulate the stage theatrics of Iggy Pop. She listed Pop's The Idiot as well as Led Zeppelin and AC/DC as inspirations for her second studio album, Warrior, intended to feature 1970s rock inspired music. Warrior, to this effect, includes a collaboration with Pop himself.

She draws inspiration from classic films as well. Her stage makeup is characterized by dramatic glitter makeup at her right eye, inspired by A Clockwork Orange. The video for "Your Love Is My Drug" features animated sequences inspired by The Beatles' film, Yellow Submarine, while the Get Sleazy tour was described as having a "post-apocalyptic Mad Max vibe".

Personal life 
Kesha is a vegetarian and a member of the LGBT community. She has previously identified as bisexual; however, in 2022, she clarified that she preferred not to label her sexuality, stating, "I'm not gay. I'm not straight. I don't know what I am. I love people ... I refuse to be anything, really, except for open to it all." She made similar statements in both 2010 and 2013. In her 2019 Attitude article, she goes deeper in discussing her sexuality, saying: "I have always been attracted to the soul behind a person's eyes. It has never occurred to me to care about a specific gender, or how someone is identifying, to make me wonder about whether or not I'm attracted to them." She also has performed legal commitment ceremonies for both same-sex and opposite-sex couples. In June 2022, Kesha revealed on Instagram that she is a "dom". She has been involved with LGBT activism as well as animal rights. Kesha stated that she was born with a quarter inch vestigial tail, "I had a tail when I was born...they chopped it off and stole my tail...I'm really sad about that story."

Kesha is a very visual performer and enjoys giving impromptu tattoos. Kesha gave Australian TV presenter Scott Tweedie a non-permanent tattoo (a drawing with a marker) of a penis, and in 2011, she gave rocker Andrew W.K. a tattoo of a line with ink from a pen and a safety pin which eventually got infected. She has also given safety pin tattoos to fans and a "hot dude" in a hotel lobby.

Health problems
On January 3, 2014, Kesha checked into Timberline Knolls Residential Treatment Center in Lemont, Illinois, for eating disorder treatment. Kesha's mother confirmed that Kesha was suffering from the eating disorder bulimia nervosa and that she has struggled with it since she was signed. She also alleged that Dr. Luke was partly to blame, saying Luke had told her to lose weight after he signed her, comparing the shape of her body to a refrigerator. Kesha completed her treatment on March 6, 2014, after spending two months in rehab.

Spiritual views
Writing for Lenny Letter, Kesha stated that she views God as "nature and space and energy and the universe. My own interpretation of spirituality isn't important, because we all have our own. What matters is that I have something greater than me as an individual that helps bring me peace." According to pop culture magazine Paper, "Homophobia and false piety eventually alienated [her] from Christianity and she's since settled on a non-denominational cocktail of meditation, mindfulness, and astrology." Kesha said she is occasionally a nihilist. She is "obsessed with religion".

Discography 

 Animal (2010)
 Warrior (2012)
 Rainbow (2017)
 High Road (2020)

Tours 
Headlining
 Get Sleazy Tour (2011)
 Warrior Tour (2013–2015)
 Kesha and the Creepies: Fuck the World Tour (2016–2017)
 Rainbow Tour (2017–2019)
 Kesha Live (2021)

Co-headlining
 North American Tour 2013 (with Pitbull) (2013)
 The Adventures of Kesha and Macklemore (with Macklemore) (2018)

Supporting
 Rihanna – Last Girl on Earth (2010)

Filmography 

 Bravo Supershow (2007)
 Final Flesh (2009)
 Walt Disney's Princess Ke$ha (2011)
 Katy Perry: Part of Me (2012)
 Jem and the Holograms (2015)
 A Ghost Story (2017)
 Rainbow: The Film (2018)

See also
List of artists who reached number one in the United States
List of animal rights advocates

References

External links 

 
 

 
1987 births
20th-century LGBT people
21st-century American rappers
21st-century American singers
21st-century American women singers
21st-century LGBT people
21st-century women pianists
21st-century women rappers
Activists from California
American autobiographers
American cosmetics businesspeople
American dance musicians
American electronic musicians
American women hip hop musicians
American guitarists
American hip hop singers
American people of Hungarian descent
American people of Polish descent
American pianists
American pop musicians
American pop rock singers
American synth-pop musicians
American women in electronic music
American women pop singers
American women rappers
American women singer-songwriters
Barnard College alumni
Dance-pop musicians
Electropop musicians
Feminist musicians
LGBT people from California
LGBT people from Tennessee
LGBT rappers
American LGBT rights activists
American LGBT singers
Living people
MTV Europe Music Award winners
Musicians from Nashville, Tennessee
Pop rappers
RCA Records artists
Singer-songwriters from California
Singer-songwriters from Tennessee
Singers from Los Angeles
Singers with a three-octave vocal range
Synth-pop singers
Women autobiographers
Yodelers